Perpetual Art Machine (PAM) was founded in New York City in January 2006 by artists Chris Borkowski, Aaron M. Miller, Raphaele Shirley and Lee Wells in collaboration with Alexis Hubshman, president of the Scope art fair. Through the use of open source CMS and DAM software such as Joomla and Gallery2, streaming video technologies and custom software developed in Max/MSP and Jitter, as well as MySQL, PAM has become a video art portal on the internet. Since its first installation in at the Scope New York art fair in March 2006 PAM has grown via its web site into a free community of more than 900 artists from over 50 countries and consists of over 1000 video art works on-line and in its interactive video installation. PAM has featured a number of notable video artists, including Lev Manovich, Janet Biggs, and John Criscitello.

Contributing members 
Rody Douzoglou
Donna Graham
Kath Gray
Prescott Mckee
Eric Payson
Miroslaw Rogala
Amelia Winger-Bearskin

External links

Scope Art Fair, New York

Video art